Spark is an open-source instant messaging program (based on XMPP protocol) that allows users to communicate in real time. It can be integrated with the Openfire server to provide additional features such as controlling the various Spark functionalities from a central management console, or integrating with a proprietary customer support service known as Fastpath which allows its users to interact with the platform using the Spark client. Being a cross-platform application, Spark can run on various systems. Installers for Windows, macOS and Linux are available on the official website.

History
Previously known as Jive Communicator, Spark was designed by Jive Software with a lightweight graphical design and simplistic user interface for business usage. Later, it was open-sourced and donated to the Ignite Realtime community, along with Openfire, for further improvement and development.

Features
Spark is based on a popular open-source Smack API library, also developed by Ignite Realtime. It has a tabbed interface for managing conversations, a quick and full history, and a search feature inside the contacts window which is designed for organizations with many units and employees. Other features include shortcuts to access recent and favorite contacts, and Spark supports ad hoc and regular group chats. Spark supports SSL/TLS encryption, and additionally provides an option to use Off-the-Record Messaging for end-to-end encryption. Though it is designed to work with XMPP servers, it can also integrate with Kraken IM Gateway plugin for Openfire, and provide an option to connect with various other IM networks.

The software’s user interface is intended to be lightweight with skins, tabbed conversations and plugin support. It contains single sign-on and file transfer capability, as well as privacy lists.

See also 

 Extensible Messaging and Presence Protocol

References

External links 
 Official website
 GitHub repository

Java platform software
Instant messaging
Free software programmed in Java (programming language)
Windows software
Linux software
Free software
Free XMPP clients